Bayreuther is the adjectival form of Bayreuth, Germany, and  may refer to:

In Bayreuth 
 Bayreuth Festival, 
  (Bayreuth pages), a monthly newsletter founded in 1878
 , an Easter Festival held at Bayreuth
 , a brewery, and its beers

Elsewhere 
 , a school in Wuppertal, Germany, founded in 1907

People 
 Gavin Bayreuther (born 1994), American professional ice hockey player

See also
 Bareuther, a surname